N119 (formally known as LHA 120-N 119) is a spiral-shaped H II region in the Large Magellanic Cloud. Its dimensions are large, at 131 x 175 pc (430 × 570 ly). It contains several luminous stars including S Doradus, LH41-1042, and LMC195-1. Its peculiar S-shaped structure is difficult to explain with classical models.

Location 

Its apparent size is roughly 9′ 14″ × 12′ 15″. It lies at the northern side of the Large Magellanic Cloud's stellar bar, 15′ southeast of the center of rotation of the galaxy's neutral hydrogen.

Structure 
The nebula seems to be in an S-shape, but on closer inspection reveals to have extensions of the spiral arms, ending in a figure 8. The unusual shape may be due to the combination of other nebula, or it may have been formed by perforation of the original molecular cloud by powerful stellar winds and explosions.

It may have also formed by a collision of two interstellar clouds, according to Annie Laval and Patricia Ambrocio-Cruz. The gas would have been compressed, forming the luminous stars seen today.

Bubbles 
N119 contains several bubble-shaped nebulae: DEM L132a; DEM L132b; DEM L123; and an unnamed WR nebula. In total the nebulosity of N119 spans .

DEM L132a is 88 parsecs across and encompasses the two luminous blue variables S Doradus and R85. However, those stars do not emit sufficient ionising radiation to produce the observed shell, and no other hot luminous stars are seen within the shell. It may have been produced by one or both of the LBVs during an earlier phase of their evolution. DEM L132b is 52 parsecs wide and surrounds two class O giants or supergiants and numerous other hot stars, which comfortably produce the necessary ionising radiation and fast winds to sculpt the bubble from the surrounding interstellar material. The WR bubble nebula is a similar size to DEM L132b and is produced by Brey 21, a binary containing a WN3 star and a B-type supergiant. DEM L123 is 158 parsecs across and its origins are unclear. No sufficiently powerful stars have been detected inside it that could produce it with their stellar wind (as this would require the power of 44 O6 supergiants) and it is ten times too energetic to have originated from a typical supernova. This bubble may have been created by a hypernova.

Observational history 
N119 was first catalogued by Karl Henize, an American Astronomer, when he made a list of Hα emission-line stars and nebulae in 1956. The full designation is LHA 120-N 119: the 119th nebula on Lamont–Hussey Observatory H-alpha (Lamont-Hussey Alpha) plate 120. Plate 120 covered the Large Magellanic Cloud while plate 115 covered the Small Magellanic Cloud. LHA 120-S 119 is a Wolf–Rayet star in another part of the LMC. There is no LHA 115-N 119 since fewer nebulae were found on the SMC plate.

It did four exposures each in the B band (2 minutes each), the V band (2 minutes each), and the Hα band (20 minutes each). It is available for download on ESO's website at 2,303 × 2,241 pixels.

Luminosity 

N119 suffers from 0.20 magnitudes of extinction in the B (blue) band, 0.15 in the V (yellow-green) band, and 0.12 in the Hα (red) band.

NGC 1910 

N119 has an associated open cluster called NGC 1910 (also known as ESO 56-SC99). Its apparent magnitude is 11.2 and its apparent size is 1.54 arcminutes.

Notes

References

External links 
Original image

H II regions
Dorado (constellation)
Large Magellanic Cloud
Star-forming regions